Victoria Isaeva is a Russian karateka. She won the silver medal in the women's kumite 68 kg event at the 2018 World Karate Championships held in Madrid, Spain. In the final, she lost against Irina Zaretska of Azerbaijan.

In June 2021, she competed at the World Olympic Qualification Tournament held in Paris, France hoping to qualify for the 2020 Summer Olympics in Tokyo, Japan. In November 2021, she competed in the women's 68 kg event at the World Karate Championships held in Dubai, United Arab Emirates.

Achievements

References 

Living people
Year of birth missing (living people)
Place of birth missing (living people)
Russian female karateka
21st-century Russian women